List of Monarchs that ruled the Kingdom of Manipur (present state of Manipur in northeast India) have been recorded in Court Chronicles of the Kings of Manipur (Cheitharol Kumbaba).

The Kingdom of Kangleipak with written constitution was established in 1110 CE by Loiyumba, ruler of Kangleipak State who incorporated most neighboring principalities. The Kangleipak kings expanded their territory, reaching their zenith under king Khagemba (1597–1652 CE). In 1714, a king named Pamheiba adopted Hinduism. He adopted the name Gharib Nawaz, and in 1724 renamed the kingdom as Manipur (Sanskrit for "abode of jewels"). Manipur was conquered by Burma in 1819 CE, and became a Princely State within the British Raj in 1825 CE till 1947 CE.

On 11 August 1947 CE, Maharajah of Manipur Bodhchandra Singh signed the Instrument of Accession agreeing to accede defense, communication and external affairs to Union of India on the assurance of autonomy of Manipur  and further signed a merger agreement in October 1949 which is disputed to be an agreement made under duress. It then became a part C state of the Republic of India in 1949 which is further upgraded to union territory in 1956 and a full fledged state in 1972.

Ancient Rulers 

A number of legendary kings are mentioned in the "Royal Chronicle", written in the 19th century.

Note:–mentoined time period of rulers in epoch of the Meitei calendar

Khapa-Nganpa Salai - Branch 

 Taang-chaa Leela Pakhangpa (1445–1405 BCE)
 Kangba (1405–1397/1359 BCE)
 Maliyafam Palcha (1397/1359–1329 BCE) 
 Kaksu Tonkonpa (1329 BCE)
 Koilou Nongtailen Pakhangpa (934 BCE)
 Unknown Rulers
 Samlungpha (44–34 BCE)
 Chingkhong Poireiton (34–18 BCE)
 Singtabung (18–8 BCE)
 Paangminnaba (8–1 BCE)

Luwang Salai - Branch 

Luwang Khunthipa (1–5 CE)
Luwang Punshipa (5–33 CE)

Ningthouja (Mangang) dynasty (33 – 1074 CE) 

The "Cheitharol Kumbaba" begins with Nongda Lairen Pakhangba (Ningthouja dynasty).

 Nongta Lailen Pakhangpa (33–154 CE),  founder of dynasty
 Khuiyoi Tompok (154–264 CE)
 Taothingmang (264–364 CE)
 Khui Ningonba (364–379 CE)
 Pengsipa (379–394 CE)
 Kaokhangpa (394–411 CE)
 Naokhampa (411–428 CE)
 Naophangpa (428–518 CE)
 Sameilang (518–568 CE)
 Urakonthoupa (568–658 CE)
 Naothingkhon (663–763 CE)
 Khongtekcha (763–773 CE)
 Keilencha (784–799 CE)
 Yalaba (799–821 CE)
 Ayangpa (821–910 CE)
 Ningthoucheng (910–949 CE)
 Chenglei-Ipan-Lanthapa (949–969 CE)
 Keiphaba Yanglon (969–984 CE)
 Irengba (984–1074 CE), last ruler of dynasty

Kangleipak dynasty (1074 – 1819 CE) 

 Loiyumba (1074–1112 CE), founder of dynasty & he provided the Meetei kingdom with a written constitution which is known as Loiyumba Sinyen.
 Loitongpa (1112–1150 CE)
 Atom Yoilempa	(1150–1163 CE)
 Iyanthapa (1163–1195 CE)
 Thayanthapa (1195–1231 CE)
 Chingthang Lanthapa (1231–1242 CE)
 Thingpai Shelhongpa (1242–1247 CE)
 Pulanthapa (1247–1263 CE)
 Khumompa (1263–1278 CE)
 Moilampa (1278–1302 CE)
 Thangpi Lanthapa (1302–1324 CE)
 Kongyampa (1324–1335 CE)
 Telheipa (1335–1355 CE)
 Tonapa (1355–1359 CE)
 Tapungpa (1359–1394 CE)
 Lailenpa (1394–1399 CE)
 Punsipa (1404–1432 CE)
 Ningthoukhompa (1432–1467 CE)
 Senpi Kiyampa (1467–1508 CE)
 Koilempa (1508–1512 CE)
 Lamkhyampa (1512–1523 CE)
 Nonginphapa (1523–1524 CE)
 Kapompa (1524–1542 CE)
 Tangchampa (1542–1545 CE)
 Chalampa (1545–1562 CE)
 Mungyampa (1562–1597 CE)
 Khagemba(1597–1652 CE)
 Khunchaopa (1652–1666 CE)
 Paikhompa (1666–1697 CE)
 Pitambar Charairongba (1697–1709 CE)
 Gharib Nawaz (Ningthem Pamheipa) (1709–1754 CE), adopted name of Manipur
 Chitsai (1754–1756 CE)
 Gaurisiam (1756–1763 CE)
 Ching-Thang Khomba (Bhagya Chandra) (1764–1798 CE)
 Rohinchandra (Harshachandra Singh) (1798–1801 CE)
 Maduchandra Singh (1801–1806 CE)
 Charajit Singh (1806–1812 CE)
 Marjit Singh (1812–1819 CE), brother of Charajit & came to power with Burmese support

Burmese rule in Manipur (1819 – 1825 CE) 

There were two feudatory kings during the time of the Burmese invasions.
Rulers-
 Raja Shubol (1819–1823 CE) 
 Raja Pitambara Singh (1823–1825 CE)

Princely State of Manipur under British Raj (1825 – 1947 CE) 

Rajas-
 Gambhir Singh (Chinglen Nongdrenkhomba) (1825–1834 CE), restored after the First Anglo-Burmese War
 Regency for Chandrakirti Singh (1834–1850 CE)
 Nara Singh (1844–1850 CE), son of Bhadra Singh
 Debendro Singh (1850 CE), brother of Nara Singh
 Chandrakirti Singh (1850–1886 CE), son of Gambhir Singh
 Surchandra Singh (1886–1890 CE)
 Kulachandra Singh (1890–1891 CE)
 Churachand Singh (1891–1918 CE)
Maharajas-
 Churachand Singh (1918–1941 CE)
 Bodhchandra Singh (1941–1947 CE), last ruler of Manipur (princely state)

Dominion of India and Republic of India 

Sovereign State of Manipur
 Bodhchandra Singh (1947–1949 CE), last official ruler of Manipur

Titular Rulers
 Bodhchandra Singh (1949–1955 CE)
 Pareihanba Okendro (1955–1976 CE)
 Leishemba Sanajaoba (1976 to till present)

See also 
 Manipur
 History of Manipur
 Manipur (princely state)
 Meitei people
 Meitei calendar
 Hinduism in Manipur
 History of India
 List of Indian monarchs

References

External links

History of Manipur:The Medieval Period - IIT Guwahati
Manipur and the mainstream by N. Tombi Singh
The court chronicles of the kings of Manipur - Cheitharol Kumpapa

Meitei